Hidden Stash III is the second b-sides and rarities collection from the Kottonmouth Kings, released on November 21, 2006, and is a 3 disc CD-DVD combo.  The album peaked #199 on the Billboard 200 and #12 on the Top Independent Albums chart on the week of December 9, 2006.  The album is composed of b-sides, remixes, solo tracks from Kottonmouth Kings members, and songs by other artists that feature guest appearances by Kottonmouth Kings members.

Track listing

Disc One

Disc Two

Bonus DVD

Chart positions

Personnel
Daddy X - Vocals, Lyrics
D-Loc - Vocals, Lyrics
Johnny Richter - Vocals, Lyrics
Lou Dogg - Drums, Percussion
DJ Bobby B - Engineer, DJ, Programmer, Turntables
Pakelika - Vocals, Lyrics ("Leagalize Or Legal Lies", "Flyin' High")
Saint Dog - Vocals, Lyrics ("Still Smokin'", "Set Me Free", "Somethin' 4 Your Stereo", "Summertime" "Rip N Tear")
Big B - Vocals, Lyrics ("The Underground", "Hit That", "Last Daze", "Remember Me", "Summertime")
Judge D - Vocals, Lyrics ("Chronic Weed", "Dust To Dust", "One Life", "Keepa Lookout", "Remember Me", "Losin' Streak", "Power Trippin'")
Dog Boy - Vocals, Lyrics ("My Selecta")
The Dirtball - Vocals, Lyrics ("Batter Swang", "Flyin' High")
Chucky Styles - Vocals, Lyrics ("Rip N Tear")

References 

Kottonmouth Kings albums
2006 albums
Suburban Noize Records albums
Sequel albums